The Airport Link Company (AirportLink Pty Ltd) is the operator of the Green Square, Mascot, Domestic Airport and International Airport railway stations on the Airport Link tunnel in Sydney, Australia. The line is serviced by T8 Airport & South Line services of the Sydney Trains network.

The tunnel and the Airport Link stations opened on 21 May 2000. The stations have seating which is a different design to the rest of the network-wide standard, with Street Furniture supplying the "Park Slim Bench"

In 2000, the Airport Link Company was placed in receivership after defaulting on its finance arrangements, with patronage figures only one quarter of forecasted figures.

In March 2011, it was announced that the Government of New South Wales would cover the cost of the station access fee at Green Square and Mascot stations, meaning that passengers no longer need to pay a surcharge to access these stations. To compensate Airport Link Company, the government now pays the company a 'shadow' station usage fee at a fixed contracted rate of approximately $2.08 per entry and exit of these stations. A fee remains in place for Domestic and International stations. Patronage on the link had been growing at 20% per year, but between March and June 2011 patronage increased by 70% as a result of the reduced fares.

In 2013, Universities Superannuation Scheme (USS) bought 49.9% of Airport Link Company from Hastings Funds Management-managed Westpac Essential Services Trust, adding to the stake it already owned. As a result, USS took control of the Airport Link Company.

Although often perceived as all going to the Airport Link Company, under the revenue sharing agreement, from August 2014 85% of revenues raised by the access fee go to the State Government. From 2015 to 2018, the Government of New South Wales received the total net revenue amount of $197.6 million from the station access fee.

References

External links
Airport Link website

Airport Link, Sydney
Railway companies of New South Wales
Westpac
Railway companies established in 1995
Australian companies established in 1995
Companies based in Sydney